The Gayiri, people, also spelt or known as Kairi, Kararya, Kari, Khararya and Kaira, Bimurraburra, Gahrarja,  Gara Gara, Ara Ara, and Kara Kara, are an Aboriginal Australian people of the state of Queensland.

Country
The Drummond Range formed their western frontier, while their eastern boundaries were drawn by the Comet and upper Mackenzie (Nogoa) rivers.

Social organisation
The Kairi were divided into hordes, the name of at least one of which is known.
 Bimurraburra. (a clan in the environs of Emerald)

Alternative names
 Khararya. (kara is their word for "no".)
 Bimurraburra.

Cullin-la-ringo massacre

Gayiri men were involved in the Cullin-la-ringo massacre, in which 19 settlers were killed as retribution after Gayiri men had been murdered after being falsely accused of stealing cattle. Settlers and native police killed around 370 Gayiri people in reprisal killings.

Notes

Citations

Sources

Aboriginal peoples of Queensland